Živko Čingo (also spelt Zhivko Chingo) (13 August 1935 – 11 August 1987) Macedonian writer, born in Velgosti, near Ohrid, Kingdom of Yugoslavia.

Biography 
He studied literature at the University of Sts Cyril and Methodius in Skopje. He worked as a journalist and as Director of the Macedonian National Theatre.

He was part of the new wave of writers to emerge on the Macedonian literary scene in the post-World War II period. One of his novels, Golemata Voda (The Great Water), has been translated into English. It was also recently made into a movie, also called The Great Water. Some other short stories have also been translated and published in various collections.

Bibliography 
 "Пасквелија" (Paskvelia, short stories, 1961)
 "Семејството Огулиновци" (Ogulinov Family, short stories, 1965)
 "Нова Пасквелија" (New Paskvelia, short stories, 1965)
 "Сребрени снегови" (Silver Snows, novel for children, 1966)
 "Пожар" (The Fire, short stories, 1970)
 "Големата вода" (The Great Water, novel, 1971)
 "Жед" (Thirst, screenplay, 1971)
 "Поле" (Field, screenplay, 1971)
 "Образов" (Cheek, play, 1973)
 "Ѕидот, водата" (The Wall, The Water, play, 1976)
 "Вљубениот дух" (The Ghost in Love, short stories, 1976)
 "Кенгурски скок" (Кangaroo Јump, play, 1979)
 "Макавејските празници"' (The Maccabean Feasts, play, 1982)
 "Накусо" (In Brief, short stories, 1984)
 "Пчеларник" (Бeehives, screenplay, 1988)
 "Гроб за душата" (Grave for the Soul, short stories, 1989)
 "Бабаџан" (Babajan, novel, 1989)
 "Бунило" (Delirium, short stories, 1989)

References

1935 births
1987 deaths
Macedonian journalists
Male journalists
Macedonian writers
Yugoslav writers
20th-century male writers
People from Ohrid Municipality
20th-century journalists